This was the first edition of the tournament.

Hsieh Cheng-peng and Christopher Rungkat won the title after defeating Leander Paes and Miguel Ángel Reyes-Varela 6–3, 2–6, [11–9] in the final.

Seeds

Draw

References

External links
 Main draw

Da Nang Tennis Open - Doubles